The Cooperative NATCCO Party (Coop-NATCCO) is a party-list in the Philippines which serves as the electoral wing of the National Confederation of Cooperatives (NATCCO). Coop-NATCCO has represented the Philippine co-operative sector in the Philippine 11th Congress  since 1998 when the party won a seat in the House of Representatives in the first ever national party-list election held in the country that year. Coop-NATCCO has continued to win a seat in Congress in the succeeding party-list elections.

Coop-NATCCO representatives have included Cong. Jose R. Ping-ay  in the 14th and 15th Congress It was during his term as chairperson in 2008 that the NATCCO reached the landmark first Billion in Assets, just four years into the “Transformation Journey”.  NATCCO became a secondary federation in 2004.Cong. Cresente C. Paez in the 11th Congress and Cong. Guillermo P. Cua in the 13th Congress and the present 14th Congress. Despite its winning votes, Coop-NATCCO had no representative in the 12th Congress because of a disqualification case brought against the party by another party-list. The disqualification issue dragged for almost the whole length of the 12th Congress. In December 2003, the (COMELEC) upheld Coop-NATCCO as a qualified party-list but by that time, it was too late for Coop-NATCCO to have a Congress Representative proclaimed for the party.

Creation
Coop-NATCCO Party-List was created through the initiative of NATCCO leaders who viewed the party-list system as an opportunity to go beyond mere dependence on traditional politicians to push forward the co-operative's legislative agenda. They recognized that active participation in the implementation of laws and government policies was necessary to ensure that the desired results for co-operative growth and development would be achieved.

On July 27, 1997, the NATCCO board met at Cauayan, Isabela and approved the Network's participation in the party-list election. Shortly after, on November 12, 1997, the board met again and commissioned Atty. Edmund Lao to prepare the party's manifestation to participate in the election and to draft the by-laws of Coop-NATCCO Network Party-List.

Coop-NATCCO Party-List was registered with the (COMELEC) on the day of the deadline, practically on the eleventh hour of the eleventh day of the eleventh month (November 11, 1997). Though the party anticipated a favorable response from the COMELEC on its registration, this did not happen as expected. On February 7, 1998, a COMELEC promulgation disqualified the party. Atty. Edmund Lao immediately filed a motion for reconsideration. Meanwhile, the party did not lose hope and still proceeded to come up with its list of five (5) nominees.

Electoral performance

References

External links
 

Party-lists represented in the House of Representatives of the Philippines
Cooperative parties
Cooperatives in the Philippines